Jamille Antonio Matt (born 20 October 1989) is a Jamaican professional footballer who plays for Walsall as a striker.

Matt began his career at Sutton Coldfield Town, before moving to Kidderminster Harriers in 2010. He spent three seasons at the club, before moving to Fleetwood Town in January 2013. He signed on loan for Stevenage in November 2015, and for Plymouth Argyle in March 2016. He moved to Blackpool in June 2016. He spent the 2017–18 on loan at Grimsby Town, before signing for Newport County in June 2018.

Career
Born in Jamaica, Matt moved from Sutton Coldfield Town to Kidderminster Harriers in November 2010 on non-contract terms, following a trial earlier in that month. Matt signed a contract with Kidderminster in May 2011. In March 2012 there were issues with Matt's work permit, and he was granted a period of leave from the club. Matt returned to first-team action in November 2012. Matt won the Conference Premier Player of the Month Award in December 2012, and he signed a new 18-month contract in January 2013.

Fleetwood Town
Later that month, Fleetwood Town broke their club record transfer fee to sign Matt. In November 2013 the club announced that Matt would be ruled out for a month with an ankle injury.

Matt was part of Fleetwood's 2013–14 team that beat Burton Albion 1–0 in the 2014 Football League Two play-off Final at Wembley Stadium, seeing Fleetwood promoted into League One for the first time in their entire history.

In August 2014 it was announced that Matt would miss the entire 2014–15 season due to injury. In May 2015 it was announced that Matt would be offered a new contract by the club.

He signed a two-month loan deal with Stevenage in November 2015.

He signed a 28-day loan deal with Plymouth Argyle in March 2016.

Blackpool
After his release by Fleetwood, Matt signed for Blackpool in June 2016. Matt scored his first goal for Blackpool in an FA Cup tie against former club Kidderminster Harriers on 6 November 2016.

After tearing his hamstring on 17 April 2017 in a 1–0 victory over Doncaster Rovers, Matt missed the remainder of the 2016–17 season. Blackpool eventually went on to beat Exeter City 2–1 in the 2017 EFL League Two play-off Final at Wembley Stadium, seeing Blackpool promoted back into League One after one season.

On 29 August 2017, Matt joined League Two side Grimsby Town on loan until end of season. He was released by Blackpool at the end of the 2017–18 season.

Newport County
On 20 June 2018, Matt joined Newport County on a two-year contract. He made his debut on 4 August in a 3–0 defeat to Mansfield Town, scoring his first goal ten days later in a 4–1 win versus Cambridge United in the EFL Cup. On 6 January 2019, he scored the first goal in Newport's 2–1 FA Cup win over Premier League side Leicester City. He was part of the team that reached the League Two playoff final at Wembley Stadium on 25 May 2019. Newport lost 1–0 to Tranmere Rovers after a goal in the 119th minute. Matt was released by Newport County at the end of the 2019–20 season.

Forest Green Rovers
Matt signed for Forest Green Rovers on 20 July 2020 on a one-year deal. On 31 December 2020, having scored 9 goals in 23 appearances, Matt exercised his option to extend his contract by a further year.

In April 2021, he was nominated for the EFL League Two Player of the Season.

Matt was appointed as club captain for the 2021–22 season.

Walsall
On 13 January 2023, Matt signed an 18-month contract with EFL League Two side Walsall, after joining for an undisclosed fee.

Career statistics

Honours

Fleetwood Town
League Two play-offs: 2014

Forest Green Rovers
League Two: 2021–22

Individual
PFA Team of the Year: 2021–22 League Two

References

External links

1989 births
Living people
Jamaican footballers
Association football forwards
Sutton Coldfield Town F.C. players
Kidderminster Harriers F.C. players
Fleetwood Town F.C. players
Stevenage F.C. players
Plymouth Argyle F.C. players
Blackpool F.C. players
Grimsby Town F.C. players
Newport County A.F.C. players
Forest Green Rovers F.C. players
Walsall F.C. players
National League (English football) players
English Football League players
Jamaican expatriate footballers
Expatriate footballers in England
Jamaican expatriate sportspeople in England